Adolfo Lionel Sevilla was the acting Defense Minister of Honduras under the interim government of Roberto Micheletti. He served in that position until February 24, 2010. He had previously been Deputy Minister of Defence. He is a member of the Liberal Party of Honduras.

References

Living people
Government ministers of Honduras
Liberal Party of Honduras politicians
Year of birth missing (living people)